The 2005 Men's Hockey Champions Trophy was the 27th edition of the Hockey Champions Trophy men's field hockey tournament. It was held in Chennai, India from 10–18 December 2005.

Squads

Head Coach: Barry Dancer

Head Coach: Bernhard Peters

Head Coach: Rajinder Singh

Head Coach: Roelant Oltmans

Head Coach: Asif Bajwa

Head Coach: Maurits Hendriks

Umpires
The following umpires were nominated by International Hockey Federation (FIH) for this tournament:

Xavier Adell (ESP)
David Gentles (AUS)
Satinder Kumar (IND)
David Leiper (SCO)
Jason McCracken (NZL)
Philip Schellekens (NED)
John Wright (RSA)
Raghu Prasad (IND)

Results
All times are Indian Standard Time (UTC+05:30)

Pool

Classification

Fifth and sixth place

Third and fourth place

Final

Awards
Topscorer
 Santi Freixa
Best Player
 Bevan George
Fair Play Trophy

Final standings

References

External links
Official FIH website

C
C
Champions Trophy (field hockey)
2005